7-Hydroxyepiandrosterone (7-OH-EPIA) may refer to:

 7α-Hydroxyepiandrosterone
 7β-Hydroxyepiandrosterone

See also
 7-Hydroxy-DHEA
 7α-Hydroxy-DHEA
 7β-Hydroxy-DHEA
 7-Keto-DHEA
 Epiandrosterone